The following outline is provided as an overview of and topical guide to Zimbabwe:

Zimbabwe – landlocked sovereign country located in Southern Africa, between the Zambezi River and Limpopo River.

General reference

 Pronunciation: 
 Common English country name:  Zimbabwe
 Official English country name:  The Republic of Zimbabwe
 Common endonym(s):  
 Official endonym(s):  
 Adjectival(s): Zimbabwean 
 Demonym(s):
 Etymology: Name of Zimbabwe
 International rankings of Zimbabwe
 ISO country codes:  ZW, ZWE, 716
 ISO region codes:  See ISO 3166-2:ZW
 Internet country code top-level domain:  .zw

Geography of Zimbabwe

Geography of Zimbabwe
 Zimbabwe is: a landlocked country
 Location:
 Eastern Hemisphere and Southern Hemisphere
 Africa
 East Africa
 Southern Africa
 Time zone:  Central Africa Time (UTC+02)
 Extreme points of Zimbabwe
 High:  Mount Nyangani 
 Low:  Confluence of Runde River and Save River 
 Land boundaries:  3,066 km
 1,231 km
 813 km
 797 km
 225 km
 Coastline:  none
 Place names in Zimbabwe
 Population: 11,392,000 people (2009 estimate) - 73rd most populous country
 Area:   - 60th largest country
 Atlas of Zimbabwe

Environment of Zimbabwe

 Climate of Zimbabwe
 Ecoregions in Zimbabwe
 Renewable energy in Zimbabwe
 Geology of Zimbabwe
 Protected areas of Zimbabwe
 National parks of Zimbabwe
 Zimbabwe Parks and Wildlife Estate
 Wildlife of Zimbabwe
 Fauna of Zimbabwe
 Birds of Zimbabwe
 Mammals of Zimbabwe

Natural geographic features of Zimbabwe
 Glaciers in Zimbabwe: none 
 Mountains of Zimbabwe
 Volcanoes in Zimbabwe: no active volcanoes
 Rivers of Zimbabwe
 World Heritage Sites in Zimbabwe

Regions of Zimbabwe

Regions of Zimbabwe

Ecoregions of Zimbabwe

List of ecoregions in Zimbabwe

Administrative divisions of Zimbabwe

Administrative divisions of Zimbabwe
 Provinces of Zimbabwe
 Districts of Zimbabwe
 Municipalities of Zimbabwe

Provinces of Zimbabwe

Provinces of Zimbabwe
Zimbabwe is divided into 8 provinces and 2 cities with provincial status:
 Bulawayo (city)
 Harare (city)
 Manicaland
 Mashonaland Central
 Mashonaland East
 Mashonaland West
 Masvingo
 Matabeleland North
 Matabeleland South
 Midlands

Districts of Zimbabwe

Districts of Zimbabwe
The Provinces of Zimbabwe are divided into 59 districts and 1,200 municipalities. The districts are listed below, by province:

 Bulawayo (city)
 Bulawayo

 Harare (city)
 Harare

 Manicaland Province
 Buhera
 Chimanimani
 Chipinge
 Makoni
 Mutare
 Mutasa
 Nyanga

 Mashonaland Central Province
 Bindura
 Guruve
 Mazowe
 Mukumbura
 Muzarabani
 Shamva

 Mashonaland East Province
 Chikomba
 Goromonzi
 Hwedza
 Marondera
 Murehwa
 Mutoko
 Uzumba-Maramba-Pfungwe

 Mashonaland West Province
 Chegutu
 Kadoma
 Kariba
 Makonde
 Zvimba

 Masvingo Province
 Bikita
 Chiredzi
 Chivi
 Gutu
 Masvingo
 Mwenezi
 Zaka

 Matabeleland North Province
 Binga
 Bubi
 Hwange
 Lupane
 Nkayi
 Tsholotsho
 Umguza

 Matabeleland South Province
 Beitbridge
 Bulilimamangwe
 Gwanda
 Insiza

 Midlands Province
 Chirumhanzu
 Gokwe North
 Gokwe South
 Gweru
 Kwekwe
 Mberengwa
 Shurugwi
 Zvishavane

Municipalities of Zimbabwe

Municipalities of Zimbabwe
 Capital of Zimbabwe: Harare
 Cities of Zimbabwe
 Largest cities:
 Harare
 Bulawayo
 Chitungwiza
 Mutare
 Gweru
 Kwekwe
 Kadoma
 Masvingo
 Chinhoyi
 Marondera

Demography of Zimbabwe

Demographics of Zimbabwe
 HIV/AIDS in Zimbabwe

Government and politics of Zimbabwe

Politics of Zimbabwe
 Form of government: semi-presidential republic
 Capital of Zimbabwe: Harare
 Politics of Rhodesia
 Elections in Zimbabwe
 Zimbabwean presidential elections
 
 Zimbabwean and Rhodesian parliamentary elections
 
 Land reform in Zimbabwe
 Liberalism in Zimbabwe
 Political parties in Zimbabwe
 Operation Murambatsvina
 Zimbabwe Revenue Authority

Branches of the government of Zimbabwe

Government of Zimbabwe

Executive branch of the government of Zimbabwe
 Head of state: President of Zimbabwe, Emmerson Mnangagwa
 Previous presidents of Zimbabwe, Robert Mugabe
 Leader of MDC, the Opposition Party: Nelson Chamisa
Previous Leader of MDC, the Opposition Party, Morgan Tsvangirai
 Cabinet of Zimbabwe

Legislative branch of the government of Zimbabwe
 Parliament of Zimbabwe (bicameral)
 Upper house: Senate of Zimbabwe
 Lower house: House of Assembly of Zimbabwe

Judicial branch of the government of Zimbabwe

Judicial branch of the government of Zimbabwe
 Supreme Court of Zimbabwe

Foreign relations of Zimbabwe

Foreign relations of Zimbabwe
 Diplomatic missions in Zimbabwe
 Diplomatic missions of Zimbabwe

Relations with specific countries
 Angola–Zimbabwe relations
 Australia–Zimbabwe relations
 Israel – Zimbabwe relations
 Namibia–Zimbabwe relations
 Sino-Zimbabwe relations
 United States-Zimbabwe relations
 Detention of US and UK diplomats in Zimbabwe
 Zimbabwe Democracy and Economic Recovery Act of 2001

International organization membership

International organization membership of Zimbabwe
The Republic of Zimbabwe is a member of:

African, Caribbean, and Pacific Group of States (ACP)
African Development Bank Group (AfDB)
African Union (AU)
Common Market for Eastern and Southern Africa (COMESA)
Food and Agriculture Organization (FAO)
General Agreement on Tariffs and Trade (GATT)
Group of 15 (G15)
International Atomic Energy Agency (IAEA)
International Bank for Reconstruction and Development (IBRD)
International Civil Aviation Organization (ICAO)
International Criminal Court (ICCt) (signatory)
International Criminal Police Organization (Interpol)
International Development Association (IDA)
International Federation of Red Cross and Red Crescent Societies (IFRCS)
International Finance Corporation (IFC)
International Fund for Agricultural Development (IFAD)
International Labour Organization (ILO)
International Maritime Organization (IMO)
International Monetary Fund (IMF)
International Olympic Committee (IOC)
International Organization for Migration (IOM)
International Organization for Standardization (ISO)
International Red Cross and Red Crescent Movement (ICRM)
International Telecommunication Union (ITU)

International Telecommunications Satellite Organization (ITSO)
International Trade Union Confederation (ITUC)
Inter-Parliamentary Union (IPU)
Multilateral Investment Guarantee Agency (MIGA)
Nonaligned Movement (NAM)
Organisation for the Prohibition of Chemical Weapons (OPCW)
Permanent Court of Arbitration (PCA)
Southern African Development Community (SADC)
United Nations (UN)
United Nations Conference on Trade and Development (UNCTAD)
United Nations Educational, Scientific, and Cultural Organization (UNESCO)
United Nations Industrial Development Organization (UNIDO)
United Nations Mission in Liberia (UNMIL)
United Nations Mission in the Sudan (UNMIS)
United Nations Operation in Cote d'Ivoire (UNOCI)
Universal Postal Union (UPU)
World Confederation of Labour (WCL)
World Customs Organization (WCO)
World Federation of Trade Unions (WFTU)
World Health Organization (WHO)
World Intellectual Property Organization (WIPO)
World Meteorological Organization (WMO)
World Tourism Organization (UNWTO)
World Trade Organization (WTO)

Law and order in Zimbabwe

Law of Zimbabwe
 Constitution of Zimbabwe
 Crime in Zimbabwe
 Human trafficking in Zimbabwe
 Human rights in Zimbabwe
 LGBT rights in Zimbabwe
 Law enforcement in Zimbabwe
 Zimbabwe Republic Police

Military of Zimbabwe

Military of Zimbabwe
 Command
 Commander-in-chief:,
 Ministry of Defence of Zimbabwe
 Joint Operations Command
 Forces
 Zimbabwe National Army
 Navy of Zimbabwe: None
 Air Force of Zimbabwe
 Special forces of Zimbabwe
 Military history of Zimbabwe

Local government in Zimbabwe

Local government in Zimbabwe

History of Zimbabwe

By period
 Pre-colonial history
 Mutapa Kingdom (c. 1450–1698)
 Torwa dynasty (c. 1450–1683)
 Rozwi Empire (c. 1684–1834)
 Matabeleland (Kingdom: 1837–1894; Province: 1923–present)
 Early European settlement (16th century; c.1890–1923)
 Colonial history  (1923–1965)
 Rhodesia  (1965–1979)
 Zimbabwe Rhodesia  (1979–1980)
 Zimbabwe  (1980 – present)

By field
 Economic history of Zimbabwe
 Military history of Zimbabwe
 Political history of Zimbabwe

Culture of Zimbabwe

Culture of Zimbabwe
 Architecture of Zimbabwe
 Cuisine of Zimbabwe
 Languages of Zimbabwe
 Official language: English
 Indigenous languages:
 Primary language of Zimbabwe: Shona (a Bantu language and the native language of the Shona people)
 Sindebele (spoken by the Matabele people)
 Media in Zimbabwe
 Newspapers in Zimbabwe
 National symbols of Zimbabwe
 Coat of arms of Zimbabwe
 Flag of Zimbabwe
 National anthem of Zimbabwe
 People of Zimbabwe
 Ndebele people
 Whites in Zimbabwe
 Prostitution in Zimbabwe
 Public holidays in Zimbabwe
 Religion in Zimbabwe
 Christianity in Zimbabwe
 Hinduism in Zimbabwe
 Islam in Zimbabwe
 Judaism in Zimbabwe
 World Heritage Sites in Zimbabwe

Art in Zimbabwe
 Art in Zimbabwe
 National Gallery of Zimbabwe
 Dance in Zimbabwe
 HIFA (Harare International Festival of the Arts)
 Music of Zimbabwe

Sports in Zimbabwe

Sports in Zimbabwe
 Football in Zimbabwe
 Zimbabwe national football team
 Zimbabwe at the Commonwealth Games
 Zimbabwe at the Olympics

Economy and infrastructure of Zimbabwe

Economy of Zimbabwe
 Economic rank, by nominal GDP (2007): 156th (one hundred and fifty sixth)
 Hyperinflation in Zimbabwe
 Communications in Zimbabwe
 Internet in Zimbabwe
 * Companies of Zimbabwe
 Currency of Zimbabwe: Dollar, Dollar, Euro, Rand, Pula, Pound Sterling
ISO 4217: ZWD/USD/EUR/ZAR/BWP/GBP
 Economic history of Zimbabwe
 Energy in Zimbabwe
 Zimbabwe Stock Exchange
 Zimbabwe Industrial Index

 Health care in Zimbabwe
 Transport in Zimbabwe
 Air transport in Zimbabwe
 Airlines in Zimbabwe
 Airports in Zimbabwe
 Rail transport in Zimbabwe
 Water supply and sanitation in Zimbabwe

Economic sectors
Agriculture in Zimbabwe
Banking in Zimbabwe
National Bank of Zimbabwe
List of banks in Zimbabwe
Communications in Zimbabwe
Mining in Zimbabwe
Tourism in Zimbabwe
Transport in Zimbabwe

Education in Zimbabwe

Education in Zimbabwe
 Universities in Zimbabwe
 NUST
 University of Zimbabwe

Health in Zimbabwe

Health in Zimbabwe

See also

Zimbabwe
Education in Zimbabwe
Index of Zimbabwe-related articles
List of international rankings
List of Zimbabwe-related topics
Member state of the United Nations
Outline of Africa
Outline of geography

Notes

References

External links

 Government
 Parliament of Zimbabwe — official government site
 Zimbabwe Government Online — official government site and mirror site

 News
 New Zimbabwe
 The Zimbabwean
 ZW News
 The Zimbabwe Guardian 
 IRIN Zimbabwe — humanitarian news and analysis

 Directories
 Columbia University Libraries — Zimbabwe directory category of the WWW-VL
 
 Yahoo!: Zimbabwe

 Tourism
 

 Other
 Kubatana The NGO Alliance Network
 Zimbabwe Agricultural Welfare Trust (ZAWT)
 Crisis in Zimbabwe Coalition
 Sokwanele Civic Action Support Group 
 BBC, Country Profile, Zimbabwe

Zimbabwe
Outline